Gerald Richard Stevens (born 1941), is a male former athlete who competed for England.

Athletics career
Stevens was selected by England to represent his country in athletics events. He won a silver medal and two bronze medals at the AAA National championships.

He represented England in the 3,000 metres steeplechase, at the 1966 British Empire and Commonwealth Games in Kingston, Jamaica.

Four years later he competed in the same event at the 1970 British Commonwealth Games in Edinburgh, Scotland.

On 1 September 1969, he set a British record of 8:30.8.

References

1941 births
English male steeplechase runners
Athletes (track and field) at the 1966 British Empire and Commonwealth Games
Athletes (track and field) at the 1970 British Commonwealth Games
Living people
Commonwealth Games competitors for England